Suwa Mach'ay (Quechua suwa thief, mach'ay cave, "thief's cave", also spelled Suamachay) is a mountain in the Andes of Peru which reaches a height of approximately . It lies in the Junín Region, Tarma Province, on the border of the districts of Huasahuasi and Palcamayo. Suwa Mach'ay lies southeast of a lake name Mamanqucha.

References 

Mountains of Peru
Mountains of Junín Region